The Crown Prince of Oman is the second most important position in Oman, second to the Sultan, and is his designated successor. Currently, the Crown Prince assumes power by taking an oath before the Sultan. This system is enforced by the Article (10) the Basic Law of the State. In the absence of the Sultan, the crown prince takes power.

On 12 January 2021, the Sultan of Oman appointed his son as the crown prince by a royal decree. This makes Theyazin bin Haitham the heir apparent and first Crown Prince of the Sultanate of Oman.

References 

Crown Prince
Oman
Crown Prince
2021 establishments in Oman